Coprosma ernodeoides, known as black-fruited coprosma in English and  or  in Hawaiian, is a sprawling shrub occurring only on the islands of Maui and Hawai‘i.

Description
Coprosma ernodeoides is a prostrate shrub with narrow, shiny, tightly packed, dark-green, opposite leaves. The flowers are small, and the most obviously visible features are the 8-20 mm pale style branches. The distinctive shiny black fruit are 8-13 mm in diameter. This is the only species of Coprosma on the Hawaiian islands with black fruit.

Range
This plant is restricted to the alpine areas of Maui and Hawai‘i.

Habitat
Coprosma ernodeoides inhabits a variety of open alpine sites, from lava and cinder fields to forest and shrublands.

Ecology

Human uses
Native Hawaiians used the fruit to make lei, the inner bark to make a yellow dye, and the fruit to make purple to black dye.

Etymology
The Hawaiian name  means "food of the nēnē".

Taxonomy
This species was described by Asa Gray in 1860 based on specimens collected by Archibald Menzies.

References

ernodeoides
Taxa named by Asa Gray
Plants described in 1860